Love Is Only a Word is a 1971 West German drama film directed by Alfred Vohrer and starring Judy Winter, Herbert Fleischmann and Malte Thorsten.

Plot
21-year-old Oliver Mansfeld is the son of an industrialist. Belatedly, he tries to complete his abitur in a boarding school. He falls head over heels in love with Verena Angenfort, ten years his senior. However, she is married to a much older banker who does business with Oliver's father. Verena and Oliver begin a violent but short-lived affair. Mansfeld does not see through the web of intrigues and entanglements around him in time and finally commits suicide.

Cast
 Judy Winter as Verena Angenfort
 Herbert Fleischmann as Manfred Angenfort
 Malte Thorsten as Oliver Mansfeld
 Donata Höffer as Geraldine Reber
 Karl Walter Diess as Butler Leo
 Joey Schoenfelder as Hansi
 Konrad Georg as Professor
 Friedrich Siemers as Dr. Florian
 Bernd Redecker as Walter Colland
 Manuel Iregsusi as Raschid
 Friedrich G. Beckhaus as Kommissar Hardenberg
 Holger Hagen as Dr. Haberl
 Inge Langen as Katharina Mansfeld, Olivers Mutter
 Dieter Wagner as Deutschlehrer
 Ossi Eckmüller as Zollbeamter
 Gretl Schörg as Pflegerin
 Elisabeth Volkmann as Angenforts Sekretärin
 Franz Rudnick as Kasilowski
 Frank Süssenguth as Pilot Teddy Behnke

References

Bibliography 
 Bock, Hans-Michael & Bergfelder, Tim. The Concise CineGraph. Encyclopedia of German Cinema. Berghahn Books, 2009.

External links 
 

1971 films
1971 drama films
German drama films
West German films
1970s German-language films
Films directed by Alfred Vohrer
Constantin Film films
Adultery in films
Films based on Austrian novels
1970s German films